ISC3 (Industrial Source Complex) model is a popular steady-state Gaussian plume model which can be used to assess pollutant concentrations from a wide variety of sources associated with an industrial complex.

This model can account for the following: 
 Point, area, line, and volume sources
 Settling and dry deposition of particles 
 Downwash 
 Separation of point sources
 Limited terrain adjustment

ISC3 operates in both long-term and short-term modes. The screening version of ISC3 is SCREEN3.

Very recently, the status of ISC3 as a Preferred/Recommended Model of the US Environmental Protection Agency has been withdrawn, but it can still be used as an alternative to the Preferred/Recommended models in regulatory applications with case-by-case justification to the reviewing authority.

Input data 

ISC short term version required two sets of data: source data and hourly averaged meteorological data:

Source data 

 Dimensions of the source
 Emission discharge rate
 Release height of the emission source

Meteorological data 

 Ambient temperature, K
 Wind direction
 Wind speed, m/s
 Atmospheric stability classes (A through F, entered as  1 through 6)
 Urban and rural mixing height, m

See also 

Bibliography of atmospheric dispersion modeling
Atmospheric dispersion modeling
List of atmospheric dispersion models

Further reading

For those who are unfamiliar with air pollution dispersion modelling and would like to learn more about the subject, it is suggested that either one of the following books be read:

 www.crcpress.com
 www.air-dispersion.com

External links
ISC3 User's Guide, Volume I
ISC3 User's Guide, Volume II
Meteorological Monitoring Guidance for Regulatory Modeling Applications

Atmospheric dispersion modeling